Dontsov is a rural locality (a khutor) in Rakityansky District, Belgorod Oblast, Russia. The population was 52 as of 2010.

Geography 
Dontsov is located 28 km northeast of Rakitnoye (the district's administrative centre) by road. Melovoye is the nearest rural locality.

References 

Rural localities in Rakityansky District